Symphleps is a genus of moths of the family Thyrididae.

Type species: Symphleps atomosalis  Warren, 1897

Species
Some species of this genus are:
Symphleps atomosalis  Hampson 1897 
Symphleps ochracea  Pagenstecher 1886 
Symphleps perfusa  Warren 1902
Symphleps seta  (Viette, 1958)
Symphleps signicostata (Strand, 1913)
Symphleps suffusa  Warren, 1898

References

Encyclopedia of Life

Thyrididae
Moth genera